Age of the Joker is the ninth studio album by the German power metal band Edguy. It was released on 26 August 2011 through Nuclear Blast.

Alongside the normal release, a double disc digipak edition was also issued, featuring b-sides, single versions of two album songs, as well as a cover of the Slade hit "Cum on Feel the Noize". A music video was shot for "Robin Hood", featuring German comedian Bernhard Hoecker and parodying the film The Adventures of Robin Hood.

The album was listed at many charts throughout Europe, reaching No. 3 in Germany, No. 10 in Czech Republic, No. 13 in Switzerland, No. 30 in Austria and No. 63 in France.

Critical reception
In a review for AllMusic, critic reviewer Jon O'Brien wrote: "Age of the Joker makes little concession to anything remotely close to the 21st century, but it's difficult to dislike a record that both wears its retro intentions so boldly on its sleeve and displays a sense of humor that's lacking in many of their fellow over-earnest hair metal revivalists."

Track listing

Personnel 

Band members
 Tobias Sammet – lead and backing vocals
 Jens Ludwig – guitar, dobro guitar on track 4
 Dirk Sauer – guitar
 Tobias "Eggi" Exxel – bass guitar
 Felix Bohnke- drums

Additional musicians
 Miro Rodenberg – keyboards, orchestral arrangements
 Simon Oberender - Hammond B3
 Cloudy Yang, Gracia Sposito, Thomas Rettke, Oliver Hartmann - backing vocals

Production
 Sascha Paeth - producer, engineer, mixing, additional keyboards
 Olaf Reitmeier - engineer
 Simon Oberender - engineer, mastering

Chart positions

References

External links
 Official Edguy site

2011 albums
Edguy albums
Nuclear Blast albums